Matthew Dubourg (1703 – 3 July 1767) was an English violinist, conductor, and composer who spent most of his life in Ireland. Among other achievements, Dubourg led the orchestra at the premiere of Georg Friedrich Handel's great oratorio Messiah.

Biography 
Dubourg was born in London, the illegitimate son of a court dancing master, his mother's identity is unknown.<ref>David J. Rhodes: "Dubourg, Matthew, in: The Encyclopaedia of Music in Ireland, ed. by Harry White and Barra Boydell (Dublin: UCD Press, 2013), p. 332.</ref> In 1712, at age 9, he performed a Corelli sonata standing on a stool at the home of Thomas Britton. At age 11, in 1714, he furthered his studies under the celebrated Italian violinist, composer and music theorist Francesco Geminiani. He performed a sonata at the Queen's Theatre in March 1714, a benefit concert in May at Hickford's Room, as well as many other performances during the London season.

On 17 June 1727 he married Frances, the daughter of musician Bernard Gates at Stanmore, Middlesex. They had one child, a daughter named Elizabeth, who married oboist Redmond Simpson on 22 September 1753, who had one child.

Dubourg served as concert-master from 1728 to 1764 in Dublin. His official title was "Chief Composer and Master of the Music attending His Majesty's State in Ireland" at Dublin Castle. He was a major force the musical life of Dublin, together with Geminiani, who was his friend and teacher for many years.

Handel's Messiah
Dubourg led the orchestra in the first performances of Handel's Messiah. Dubourg had worked with Handel as early as 1719 in London. The premiere of Messiah took place at "Mr Neale's Music Hall" in Dublin on 13 April 1742.

Permission to use members of the choirs from Dublin's cathedrals had been granted by the dean of Saint Patrick's Cathedral, Jonathan Swift (1667–1745) (who is better known today as the author of Gulliver's Travels). However, Swift then withdrew his permission, only to grant it once again as the dates for the performances drew near. Swift also had no kind words for Dubourg's orchestra. He called them "a club of fiddlers in Fishamble Street".

Handel led the performance of Messiah from the harpsichord, and Dubourg conducted the orchestra. Despite Swift's sally against Dubourg's orchestra, Handel thought they played quite well, writing to Charles Jennens, "as for the Instruments they are really excellent, Mr. Dubourgh being at the Head of them, and the Musick sounds delightfully in this charming Room".

Of a concert in 1742 conducted by Handel, the following anecdote was told: Dubourg played a cadenza in which he wandered far from the theme creating complex modulations of it. When he finally returned to the original theme, Handel said: "Welcome home, Monsieur Dubourg".

Following the premiere of Messiah Dubourg travelled to London with Handel and performed several other works with him at Covent Garden, including Samson, L'Allegro ed il Penseroso, and the London premiere of the Messiah in 1743. He returned to Dublin in October.

Works
Dubourg wrote several works, which are still frequently played, particularly in Britain. One of his passions was to take famous Irish tunes and morph them in the late Baroque style as, for example, with his Variations of Druid Tunes. His variations of the sonatas (op. 5) of Arcangelo Corelli are also often heard.

Later life and death
In 1752, Dubourg became Master of the Royal Chapel in London, a post he occupied until his death in 1767. On 3 July 1767 Dubourg made a brief will leaving most of his estate to his wife Frances, and he died shortly thereafter. There is some question on the date of death, but his registered date of death is 5 July 1767.  The inscription on his tombstone reads:

"Here lyeth the body of Matthew Dubourg, chief composer and master of music in the kingdom of Ireland, servant to four generations of the illustrious House of Hanover, George I. and II., his Royal Highness the late Prince of Wales, and His present Majesty; as also instructor in Music to their Royal Highnesses the Duke of Cumberland and the late Prince Frederick. He died July 5, 1767, aged 64."Tho' sweet Orpheus thou couds'tBringSoft pleadings from the trembling stringUnmov'd the King of Terror stands,Nor owns the magic of thy hands''

References

Sources
Entry on Dubourg in the French Wikipedia
Notes on Handel's Messiah by Jeffrey Thomas, Music Director of the American Bach Soloists

1703 births
1767 deaths
18th-century classical composers
18th-century British male musicians
18th-century conductors (music)
Concertmasters
English Baroque composers
English classical composers
English male classical composers
Irish conductors (music)
Irish violinists
Male classical violinists